Slatvina is a village and municipality in the Spišská Nová Ves District in the Košice Region of central-eastern Slovakia. It has a population of 334 inhabitants as of 2017.

History
In historical records the village was first mentioned in 1246 as a zek and was originally a place of border guards of the emerging Hungarian state. Therefore, the local nobles wore the title de Szék. It was not until 1525 that the Slavic name form emerged as Szlatwin. Before that year, the village was owned by the Zsigray family, after which it came under the dominion of the Spiš Castle and thus under landlords such as Zápolya , Thurzo and Csáky. In 1828 there were 29 houses and 218 inhabitants whose main source of income was agriculture.

Geography
The village lies at an altitude of 479 metres and covers an area of 4.408 km².
It has a population of about 305 people.

References

External links
Official homepage
http://www.statistics.sk/mosmis/eng/run.html

Villages and municipalities in Spišská Nová Ves District